CMP may refer to:

Medicine 
 Cardiomyopathy, a heart muscle disease
 Chondromalacia patellae, a degenerative condition of the knee cap (patella)
 Chronic myofascial pain, also known as myofascial pain syndrome, a condition associated with hypersensitive muscular trigger points
 Common myeloid progenitor, otherwise known as CFU-GEMM, the multipotent progenitor cell for the myeloid cell lineage
 Comprehensive metabolic panel, a group of 14 blood tests often used in medical diagnosis
 Cytidine monophosphate, a DNA nucleotide

Military and firearms 
 Canadian Military Pattern truck, a truck design in World War II
 Chief of Military Personnel, the senior Canadian Armed Forces officer responsible for the military's human resource programs
 Civilian Marksmanship Program, a U.S. government program that promotes firearms safety training and rifle practice
 Compact machine pistol, a class of firearm that encompasses small fully automatic firearms
 Corps of Military Police, a forerunner of the Royal Military Police

Science and technology 
 Camshaft position sensor, an engine sensor that can be used in used in combination with a crankshaft position sensor
 Center for Machine Perception, a research group at Czech Technical University in Prague, Czech Republic
 Chemical-mechanical polishing, a technique used in semiconductor fabrication; also known as planarization
 Command Module Pilot, a position of the Apollo program crewed missions
 Condensed matter physics, a branch of physics
 Cytidine monophosphate

Computing 
 cmp (Unix), a Unix command for byte-comparing two files
 Certificate Management Protocol, an Internet protocol for obtaining X.509 digital certificates in a public key infrastructure
 Chip-level multiprocessing
 Cloud management platform
 Consent Management Provider, for cookies management
 Container-Managed Persistence, a deprecated form of persistence of Enterprise JavaBeans

Other uses
 The Center for Medical Progress
 Central Maine Power
 Certified Meeting Professional, one of many designations available for a meeting and convention planner
 Chipmunk Punk, a New Wave music album by The Chipmunks
 Citizens' Municipal Organisation, known before as the Citizen's Municipal Party
 CM Punk, a WWE wrestler who has held multiple world championships
 Closed materials procedures, court proceedings under the Justice and Security Act 2013 (UK) that permit evidence to be heard in secret, without notice to one party
 Comparative Manifestos Project, a project that compiled the Manifesto Project Database
 Copa Airlines, by ICAO code
 Compagnie du chemin de fer métropolitain de Paris, the company operating the Paris Métro system until 1948
 Company of Mission Priests, an order of Anglican priests living under a common rule of life
 Congestion management program
 Conjugated microporous polymer, a type of porous material
 Cancionero Musical de Palacio, a Spanish manuscript of Renaissance music
Chevrolet CMP, a rebadged Daewoo Labo/Suzuki Carry van
Common Modular Platform, a car platform developed by PSA Group and Dongfeng Motor
Chattogram Metropolitan Police, police department in Bangladesh

See also